Tuanku Aishah Rohani binti Almarhum Tengku Besar Mahmud is the current Tunku Ampuan Besar or Queen consort of Negeri Sembilan. She is married to the current Yang di-Pertuan Besar of Negeri Sembilan, Tuanku Muhriz ibni Almarhum Tuanku Munawir.

Background
Tengku Aishah was born on 19 June 1952, in Batu Gajah, Perak to Tengku Seri Utama Raja Tengku Besar Mahmud ibni Almarhum Sultan Zainal Abidin III and his second wife, To' Puan Hajjah Zainun binti Haji Su Mahmud. She is of Terengganu royal lineage.

Tengku Aishah studied in Sekolah Rendah Sultan Sulaiman, Kuala Terengganu and later Convent Taiping. She also studied in Convent Bukit Nanas in Kuala Lumpur.

She previously worked in a bank where she met her husband, Tunku Muhriz.

Marriage
Tengku Aishah married Tunku Muhriz in Istana Maziah, Kuala Terengganu on 25 April 1974. Three princes issued from the marriage: Tunku Besar Seri Menanti Tunku Ali Redhauddin Muhriz, Tunku Zain 'Abidin Muhriz and Tunku Alif Hussein Saifuddin Al-Amin.

Becoming Queen
Tuanku Aishah was installed the 11th Tunku Ampuan Besar of Negeri Sembilan on 14 April 2009 in Seri Menanti royal palace. The ceremony was steeped in tradition and followed old Negeri Sembilan royal customs where the installation of the queen preceded the installation of the Yang di-Pertuan Besar of Negeri Sembilan.

Awards

Tuanku Aishah was awarded the Darjah Kerabat Negeri Sembilan Yang Amat Dihormati (DKNS) by Tuanku Muhriz on 21 April 2009. The award was established in 1978 and is usually bestowed upon royal members of the Negeri Sembilan household by the Yang di-Pertuan Besar or to fellow Sultans of the other states.

 : 
  Member of the Royal Family Order of Negeri Sembilan (DKNS, 21 April 2009)
  Knight Commander or Dato' Paduka of the Grand Order of Tuanku Ja’afar (DPTJ)
  Recipient of the Distinguished Conduct Medal (PPT)

Places named after her

Several places were named after her, including:

 Hospital Tunku Ampuan Besar Tuanku Aishah Rohani in Cheras, Kuala Lumpur
 Sekolah Menengah Sains Tuanku Aishah Rohani, a science girls school in Seremban, Negeri Sembilan

References

Negeri Sembilan royal consorts
1952 births
Living people
Malaysian Muslims
Malaysian people of Malay descent
Royal House of Negeri Sembilan
People from Perak
People from Terengganu